Colin Barrett (born April 26, 1982) is an Irish Canadian writer, published since 2009. He started his career with the 2009 publication of Let's Go Kill Ourselves in The Stinging Fly. Barrett released one novella and six short stories with Young Skins in 2013. He released an additional eight short stories with Homesickness in 2022.

Barrett received multiple awards for Young Skins. These included the Frank O'Connor International Short Story Award and the Rooney Prize for Irish Literature in 2014. For adaptations of his short stories, two of his works were made into plays for the New Theatre, Dublin in 2017 while Calm With Horses debuted at the Toronto International Film Festival in 2019.

Early life and education
After Barrett's 1982 birth in Fort McMurray, Barrett and his family moved to Toronto. Upon leaving Canada for Ireland at the age of four, Barrett spent his childhood in Knockmore, Co. Mayo.  with his four siblings and his parents. He was on Gaelic football teams as an adolescent in Ballina. Barrett studied at University College Dublin and was awarded a BA in English, 2003; MA in Creative Writing, 2009; MFA in Creative Writing 2015.

Career
Barrett started his literary career with comic books during his childhood before he moved on to poetry and books as an adult. For his earlier works, Barrett "spent 10 years not finishing anything". One of the short stories that Barrett did not finish was titled Ontario. In between his college studies, Barrett was hired by Vodafone as a customer representative from 2003 to 2008.

In 2009, Barrett became a short story author when The Stinging Fly released his work entitled Let's Go Kill Ourselves. Barrett released a book of seven works with his 2013 publication of Young Skins. Of the works in Young Skins, most are short stories while Calm With Horses is a novella. With Homesickness, Barrett included an additional eight short stories with his 2022 publication. During the COVID-19 pandemic, Barrett completed Homesickness and an unpublished book at the same time. His book, How the Land Lies is scheduled to be made available in 2024.

Of the Young Skins stories, director Nick Rowland worked on creating a movie based on Calm with Horses between 2014 and 2018. In 2019, Calm With Horses debuted at the Toronto International Film Festival. Bait and The Clancy Kid were made into plays for New Theatre, Dublin in 2017.

Writing process and themes
To create his stories, Barrett said he would "look for one tiny detail and expand upon it". He also focuses on the people instead of the events to make his works. Some of his inspirations include Flannery O'Connor and Denis Johnson. With Let's Go Kill Ourselves, Barrett created Dunvale, Ireland for his short story.

Barrett had Young Skins occur in a made up location called Glanbeigh, Ireland. With Homesickness, Barrett continued to used locations in Ireland while also using Canada for one of his short stories. Some of the topics that Barrett wrote about were about a missing child with The Clancy Kid. With A Shooting in Rathreedane, Barrett wrote about a member of the Garda who investigates a shooting.

Awards and personal life
During the 2010s, the Arts Council gave Barrett a bursary three times. At the Irish Book Awards in 2013, Barrett was nominated for the Writing.ie Short Story of the Year award with Bait and the Sunday Independent Newcomer of the Year award with Young Skins. For Young Skins, Barrett received the 2014 Frank O'Connor International Short Story Award. Additional awards Barrett won in 2014 with Young Skins were the Rooney Prize for Irish Literature and the Guardian First Book Award In 2015, the National Book Foundation selected him as one of their 5 Under 35. Barrett is married and has two kids.

References

1982 births
Irish people of Canadian descent
Canadian short story writers
Living people